B-Brave were a boy band from the Netherlands founded in 2013. It consisted of Kaj van der Voort, Samuel Leijten, Cassius Verbond, Dioni Gomez-Jurado, and Jai Wowor. B-Brave placed third in the fifth series of the Dutch version of the X Factor.

History
B-Brave signed to Sony Music on July 17, 2013. The band stated their intentions to create music in English, in order to appeal to a more international market. The group disbanded in 2017.

Members

Discography

Albums

Singles

References

Dutch boy bands
Dutch pop music groups
Musical groups established in 2013
Musical groups disestablished in 2017
Musical quintets
The X Factor contestants
2013 establishments in the Netherlands